Kostas Nikolaidis (born 10 September 1944) is a former Greek professional footballer who played as a striker. During his presence in Greek championship he scored 100 goals, which ranks him amongst the top scorers in the history of the institution.

Early life
Born in Safrabolis a district of Nea Ionia in Athens, Nikolaidis had also descent from North Epirus, where his father, Ilias left in 1918 during the World War I. His love for football brought him at the door of the local PAO Safrabolis' youth team, in 1958, where at the age of 14 made his first tryout in order to join the club. The tryout was unsuccessful as he has turned down by the team's coach Krassas, but eventually, a year later Nikolaidis managed to join PAO Safrabolis after a second tryout.

Club career

Early career
Nikolaidis made his first steps in youth team of PAO Safrabolis in 1959, where at the age of 15 established himself quickly in the youth departments of the club, making it into the first team a year later. After a very successful 6-year spell, he managed to promote the club from the local divisions of Athens to the  second national division and caught the interest of AEK Athens.

AEK Athens
In 1965 Nikolaidis, alongside other players from his club, after a recommendation from Georgios Magiras, was transferred at AEK at the age of 21 and became a regular after his impressive performances in the friendlies. There he formed a deadly attacking duo with the legendary Mimis Papaioannou, which helped in the club's later success. In his first derby against Panathinakos, on 19 December 1965, he scored a brace in their 3–2 win at Leoforos Alexandras Stadium. On 20 December 1967 he scored a hat-trick in the imposing 5–0 at home over Olympiakos Nicosia. His 2 goals against Olympiacos on 31 March 1968, won the derby for the club and gave them to a high extend the title at the end of the season. He was a member of the team that reached the European Cup quarter-finals in 1969. On 29 September 1972 his goal at the 89th minute gave the AEK the victory over Internazionale with 3–2 for the European Cup, in Nea Filadelfeia. During his spell at AEK he won 2 league titles and 1 Greek Cup in

Later career
In 1973 after he was released from AEK, Nikolaidis signed for PAS Giannina, where he played for a season, winning the second division championship, helping the club to be promoted to the first division.

The following season Nikolaidis was transferred to Apollon Athens, where he played 2 seasons, winning again the second division championship and playing his final season at the highest tear of Greece. Except his impressive 100 goals in total for the Greek Championship, Nikolaidis managed to score in 8 consecutive league games being one of 4 players that ever achieve that alongside Giorgos Sideris, Demis Nikolaidis and Kostas Mitroglou.

In 1976 he joined Olympiakos Neon Liosion, where he played for a season before finishing his career as a footballer.

International career
Nikolaidis played in 1962 with Greece U19, under Georgios Magiras, making 10 appearances.

Nikolaidis played with Greece four times between 1971 and 1973. He made his debut on 17 November 1971, in a friendly match against Bulgaria which ended in a 2–2 draw.

Club statistics

 a.  Does not include 2nd division stats for Apollon Athens.

Honours

AEK Athens
Alpha Ethniki: 1967–68, 1970–71
Greek Cup: 1965–66

PAS Giannina
Beta Ethniki: 1973–74

Apollon Athens
Beta Ethniki: 1974–75

Individual
Greek Cup top scorer: 1966–67

References

1944 births
Living people
AEK Athens F.C. players
PAS Giannina F.C. players
Apollon Smyrnis F.C. players
Greece international footballers
Super League Greece players
Super League Greece 2 players
Association football forwards
Footballers from Athens
Greek footballers